Vermelho is a 1996 EP by Brazilian musician Vange Leonel.

Vermelho may also refer to:

 Mar Vermelho, Alagoas, Brazil
 Monte Vermelho, Fogo, Cape Verde
 Rio Vermelho, Minas Gerais, Brazil
 Vermelho Novo, Minas Gerais
 Vermelho Velho, Minas Gerais, Brazil
 Vermelho River (disambiguation)

See also